Staki–Technorama is a men's UCI Continental cycling team, based in Lithuania. It is named as first professional cycling club in Lithuania.

Team roster

References

Cycling teams based in Lithuania
UCI Continental Teams (Europe)
Cycling teams established in 2016
2016 establishments in Lithuania